Nesotrochis is a genus of extinct flightless birds, formerly native to the islands of the Greater Antilles in the Caribbean. Its species are considered examples of insular gigantism. It contains 3 species known from subfossil remains of Late Pleistocene and Holocene age found in cave deposits, and consequently they have been collectively referred to as the West Indian cave rails. Previously considered rails in the family Rallidae, In 2021, DNA analysis of a complete mitochondrial genome of N. steganinos indicated that they were not rails but an independent lineage of gruiform birds, with their closest relatives being the family Sarothruridae native to Africa, Madagascar, New Guinea and Wallacea, and the extinct adzebills of New Zealand.
 Antillean cave rail, Nesotrochis debooyi (Puerto Rico and Virgin Islands, West Indies) - may have survived until historic times
 Haitian cave rail, Nesotrochis steganinos (Haiti, West Indies) - prehistoric
 Cuban cave rail, Nesotrochis picapicensis (Cuba, West Indies) - prehistoric

References 

Bird genera
Holocene extinctions
Taxa named by Alexander Wetmore